Jack Robert Vale (born 3 March 2001) is a Welsh professional footballer who plays as a forward for  side Blackburn Rovers, and the Wales under-21 national team.

Club career
On 16 March 2017, Vale signed his professional contract with Blackburn on a two-and-a-half-year deal. He signed a new long-term deal on 4 October 2019, agreeing a deal to keep him at the club until the summer of 2023.

On 5 March 2020, National League outfit Barrow announced that they had agreed a deal to take Vale on loan until the end of the season. However, as a result of the ongoing COVID-19 pandemic, the National League announced on 16 March that the season would be suspended until the beginning of April. Days before the league was due to resume, it was announced that the season had been suspended indefinitely. As a result, Vale was unable to make a single appearance for Barrow.

Vale made his professional debut for Blackburn in the club's first Championship game of the 2020–21 season against Reading on 18 July 2020, coming on as a substitute for Adam Armstrong in the 78th minute of the game. Blackburn sealed a 4–3 victory against The Royals after a late goal by Sam Gallagher.

On 1 February 2021, Vale joined League One side Rochdale until the end of the season. Vale joined a side which were ultimately relegated to League Two, only managing to make three appearances for Rochdale.

On 9 September 2021, Vale joined National League side FC Halifax Town, linking up with fellow academy player Aidan Dowling at the club. Vale made his National League debut for Halifax two days later on 11 September, in the club's 3–1 defeat of Southend United. He scored the first professional goal of his career on 14 December, scoring in the 93rd minute to secure a 2–0 win against King's Lynn Town.

International career
Vale has represented the Wales national team at U17, U19 and U21 level.

Career statistics

References

External links 

Blackburn Rovers profile

2001 births
Living people
Footballers from Wrexham
Association football forwards
Welsh footballers
Wales under-21 international footballers
Blackburn Rovers F.C. players
Barrow A.F.C. players
Rochdale A.F.C. players
English Football League players
FC Halifax Town players
National League (English football) players